Myron Macy Kinley was a pioneer in fighting oil well fires. He was born in Santa Barbara, California, in 1898 and died May 12, 1978. 

During Kinley's life he developed many patents and designs for the tools and techniques of oil firefighting. He also trained others in their use, including legendary Red Adair, "Boots" Hansen and "Coots" Mathews (Boots & Coots). Virtually every organization in the oil well firefighting business today can trace its roots back to Myron Kinley and the MM Kinley Company.  

Kinley's father Karl T. Kinley was an oil well shooter in California; Karl dynamited wells to fracture the rock and to increase flow. In 1913, faced with a roaring fire resulting from a blowout, Karl tried blowing it out with a giant "puff" of dynamite. It worked, and remains a common technique for fighting oil fires.

Young Kinley, who helped with the first shot, went on to develop the business of oil well firefighting, and essentially established the industry. Although it was lucrative, it had its risks. Kinley's right leg was permanently injured in late 1936 at the Bay City fire. 

Kinley's brother, Floyd Kinley died March 12, 1938, from injuries at a Goliad, Texas, blowout accident, he was born November 28, 1904, in Bundrage, California. 

Kinley was also severely burned in an accident in Venezuela in 1945. He survived many incidents and died at home in Chickasha, Oklahoma, on May 12, 1978.

Kinley's parents; Karl T. Kinley and Katherine Rose Scholl were married July 4, 1896, in Pasadena, California. As a baby, Kinley moved to Bakersfield in 1899. His sister Lucille was born in 1902; she lived in Ohio, California. Myron Kinley married Rowena May Hall in 1924. Kinley was later married to his second wife Jessie Dearing in 1958. In 1996, Jessie Kinley published the book Call Kinley about Myron Kinley's achievements.

References 

 Chickasha Area Arts Council Brief funerary bio sketch of Kinley and his wife.
 The Fire Beater, a 1953 article from Time magazine.

1898 births
1978 deaths
American firefighters